Vasilios Papachristou (born 8 January 1959) is a Greek former football player and manager who played as a midfielder.

References

1959 births
Living people
People from Ioannina (regional unit)
Greek footballers
Footballers from Epirus (region)
Association football midfielders
Atromitos F.C. players
PAS Giannina F.C. players
Olympiacos F.C. players
Ethnikos Piraeus F.C. players
Greek football managers
PAS Giannina F.C. managers
Ethnikos Piraeus F.C. managers
Anagennisi Karditsa F.C. managers
Leonidio F.C. managers
Paniliakos F.C. managers
Patraikos F.C. managers
Levadiakos F.C. managers
Panachaiki F.C. managers
Olympiacos Volos F.C. managers
Kalamata F.C. managers
Pierikos F.C. managers
Veria F.C. managers
Ilisiakos F.C. managers